Matthew David Hunn (born 22 March 1994) is a former English professional cricketer who played for Kent County Cricket Club. He is a right-handed batsman and a right-arm medium-fast bowler.

Hunn went to St Joseph's College in Ipswich. After playing for Suffolk youth teams and some matches for Essex XIs, Hunn joined Kent in 2013 and made his debut the same year. He played in seven Kent Second XI games, claiming 19 wickets.

Hunn made his first-class cricket debut against Lancashire in September 2013. He took 2 wickets for 51 runs on debut. He retained a dual-registration to play for Suffolk, appearing for the team once in the Minor Counties Trophy in 2017 when not required by Kent and plays club cricket for Sandwich Town Cricket Club in the Kent Cricket League. He played in Australia for Newcastle City Cricket Club in New South Wales during the 2014/15 English off-season.

Hunn was released by Kent when his contract expired at the end of the 2018 season to pursue non-cricketing career options. Hunn had only made one appearance for the county First XI in the season and played rarely for the Second XI during his final professional season.

References

External links

1994 births
Living people
People educated at St Joseph's College, Ipswich
English cricketers
Kent cricketers
Suffolk cricketers